Medway station was a railroad station in Medway, Massachusetts. It served the West Medway Branch (later the Millis Branch), and opened in 1861.

History

Medway station was originally part of the New York, New Haven and Hartford Railroad, until the line was cut back to Needham Junction in July 1938. Service to Medway was restored in 1940 when the line was extended to Bellingham Junction, but was shortly thereafter cut back to Caryville, only to be cut back further to West Medway in 1941. By 1955, ridership on the line was remarkably poor, and only a single round trip per day served the station.

Only two years after the Massachusetts Bay Transportation Authority was formed, service to the station was no longer available. The Town of Medway decided to not continue funding the train and the line was subsequently cut back to Millis. Just under a year later, service on the entire line past Needham Junction was discontinued, and has not returned since.

Both the tracks and the station building are long destroyed, and the only indication of former railroad service in the town is a dirt path where the railroad formerly ran.

References

MBTA Commuter Rail stations in Norfolk County, Massachusetts
Former MBTA stations in Massachusetts
Railway stations in the United States opened in 1861
Railway stations closed in 1966
1861 establishments in Massachusetts
Medway, Massachusetts